The Empty Bottle is a bar and music venue in Chicago, Illinois.

Empty Bottle may also refer to:

"Empty Bottle", song from 2005 Ingrid Michaelson album Slow the Rain
"Empty Bottle", song from 2015 Veruca Salt album Ghost Notes
"Empty Bottle", song from 2016 Owen album The King of Whys